Annette Echikunwoke (born 29 July 1996) is a Nigerian-American hammer thrower who lives in Ohio, United States. She was due to represent Nigeria at the 2020 Summer Olympics, but was disqualified due to the negligence of the Athletics Federation of Nigeria. She holds the African area record in hammer throw, with a throw of 75.49m in Tucson in 2021.

Early life
Annette Echikunwoke started athletic throwing events in school after she won the shot put and discus throw at a sports day event, deciding that if she was good she might as well continue. Her cousin is actress Megalyn Echikunwoke.

Career
Echikunwoke is from Pickerington North in Ohio, and attended the University of Cincinnati for both her undergraduate and master's degree, where she was on the track and field team. With Cincinnati she won the weight throw event at the 2017 NCAA Championship, also becoming the university's first NCAA champion in track and field. She was eligible to compete for the United States until 31 December 2020, when she elected to represent her parents' home country of Nigeria in Olympic national selection.

In 2021, Echikunwoke threw four successive Nigerian and African records in hammer, setting the mark at 75.49m USATF Throws Festival in Tucson, Arizona, on 22 May 2021. She is ranked #7 in the world in the women's hammer throw; she has previously been ranked #101 in the world in women's shot put with a personal best of 16.79m in 2017. She also throws discus and 20lb weight (a US indoor equivalent to the hammer).

Echikunwoke was due to represent Nigeria at the 2020 Summer Olympics in Tokyo, but was told on 29 July 2021 that she could not compete due to the negligence of the Nigerian Federation not setting up drug tests and not relaying her need to share her whereabouts. Ten Nigerian athletes set to compete in 2021, a large percentage of the Nigeria Olympic Committee (NOC)'s delegation, were disqualified because of the negligence of the Athletics Federation of Nigeria. The AFN said that many of its athletes based in the United States did not keep the AFN updated on their location, though they did not name Echikunwoke; she claimed that the AFN requested her location for drug testing six times, and that she provided the location but no officials ever came to perform the tests.

National titles
NCAA Division I Women's Indoor Track and Field Championships
Weight throw: 2017

References

External links
 Cincinnati Bearcats bio

1996 births
Living people
Nigerian female hammer throwers
American female hammer throwers
American sportspeople of Nigerian descent
Cincinnati Bearcats women's track and field athletes